The 24th Bangladesh National Film Awards, presented by Ministry of Information, Bangladesh to felicitate the best of Bangladeshi Cinema released in the year 1999. The National Film Awards are the only film awards given by the government itself. Every year, a national panel appointed by the government selects the winning entry, and the award ceremony is held in Dhaka. The ceremony took place at Osmany Memorial Hall, Dhaka and awards were distributed by former prime minister Khaleda Zia. Additionally, Information Minister Tariqul Islam attended the function as the special guest at that evening.

List of winners
A 12-member jury board headed by former secretary A H Mofazzal Karim recommended a total of 18 artists to be awarded for 1999.

Merit Awards

Technical Awards

See also
Bachsas Awards
Meril Prothom Alo Awards
Ifad Film Club Award
Babisas Award

References

External links

National Film Awards (Bangladesh) ceremonies
1999 film awards
2003 awards in Bangladesh
2003 in Dhaka
September 2003 events in Bangladesh